This is a page dedicated to the state high schools in the region of Angus, Scotland.

External links
 Angus Secondary School Attainment levels 2007-2009 (Angus Council)